In order to facilitate access to written legal opinions, some U.S. court systems provide them on CourtWeb, which, unlike PACER, does not require registration.

Scope
As of August 2016, CourtWeb has records from only 30 courts, for which it uses these informal names:

Alabama Northern Bankruptcy Court
Alaska Bankruptcy Court
Alaska District Court
California Northern Bankruptcy Court
California Northern District Court
Connecticut District Court
Hawaii Bankruptcy Court
Idaho District Court AKA United_States_District_Court_for_the_District_of_Idaho
United States District Court for the Northern District of Illinois (which CourtWeb calls the Illinois Northern District Court)
Iowa Southern District Court 
Minnesota District Court
Missouri Eastern District Court
Missouri Western Bankruptcy Court
Missouri Western District Court
Nebraska District Court
New Jersey Bankruptcy Court
Ohio Northern District Court
Pennsylvania Middle District Court
Puerto Rico Bankruptcy Court
Tennessee Middle Bankruptcy Court
Texas Southern District Court
Texas Western District (Thru 5/12) Court
U.S. Virgin Islands District Court
U.S.Virgin Islands Bankruptcy Court
Utah District Court
Vermont District Court
Washington Eastern Bankruptcy Court
Washington Eastern District Court
Washington Western Bankruptcy (Thru 5/14) Court
West Virginia Northern Bankruptcy Court

References

Legal research